Bahr Ghan (also Romanized as Bahr Ghān; also known as Bahr Khān, Barghān, Barqūn, Berghān, and Berghūn) is a village in Shesh Pir Rural District, Hamaijan District, Sepidan County, Fars Province, Iran. At the 2006 census, its population was 1,651, in 392 families.

References 

Populated places in Sepidan County